Luigi Tansillo (1510–1568) was an Italian poet of the Petrarchian school.  Born in Venosa, he entered the service of Pedro Álvarez de Toledo in 1536 and in 1540 entered the Accademia degli Umidi, soon renamed Accademia Fiorentina.

He was associated with the Court of Naples and served as Captain of Justice at Gaeta.

His work Il vendemmiatore, written in his youth, was considered licentious enough to be placed on the Index Librorum Prohibitorum by Pope Paul IV.

His work Il podere, concerned with agronomy, was inspired by Columella with its precise observations on the choice of a good agricultural estate.

Jacquet de Berchem set some of his texts, as did Giovanni Tommaso Benedictis da Pascarola.  François de Malherbe’s Larmes de Saint Pierre, imitated from Tansillo, appeared in 1587, and in 1594 Orlando di Lasso also set Le lagrime di San Pietro.  William Roscoe’s translation of Tansillo's Nurse appeared in 1798, and went through several editions. Tansillo died in Teano at the age of 58.

Works
I due pellegrini (1530)
Il vendemmiatore (1532–1534)
Stanze a Bernardino Martirano (1540)
Clorida (1547)
La Balia (1552)
Il podere (1560)
Le lagrime di San Pietro (1560)
Liriche
Il canzoniere

Sources
Francesco Ambrosoli, Manuale della Letteratura Italiana , seconda edizione ricorretta e accresciuta dall'autore (Vol.II, Firenze, G.Barbèra Editore), 1863.

References

1510 births
1568 deaths
People from Venosa
16th-century Italian poets
Italian male poets
16th-century male writers